Zénon Lesage was a politician Quebec, Canada and a Member of the Legislative Assembly of Quebec (MLA).

Early life

He was born on December 18, 1885 in Sainte-Thérèse, Quebec and became a physician.

City Councillor

Lesage won a seat to the City Council of Montreal in 1930 against Ernest Poulin, who also was a Liberal member of the provincial legislature. Lesage was re-elected in 1932, 1934 against Poulin, 1936, 1938, 1940 and 1942. He did not run for re-election in 1944.

Member of the legislature

He ran as an Action libérale nationale candidate in the district of Montréal-Laurier in the 1935 provincial election and defeated Poulin. Lesage joined Maurice Duplessis's Union Nationale, but was defeated in 1936 and 1939.

Death

He died on February 4, 1956.

Footnotes

1885 births
1956 deaths
Action libérale nationale MNAs
Montreal city councillors
People from Sainte-Thérèse, Quebec